Cole Holcomb (born July 30, 1996) is an American football linebacker for the Pittsburgh Steelers of the National Football League (NFL). He played college football at North Carolina and was drafted by Washington Redskins in the fifth round of the 2019 NFL Draft.

College career
Holcomb walked on to the team as a freshman and appeared in all 14 games, mainly on special teams. His playing time grew as he continued to improve and eventually earned a scholarship, playing in 35 games over the next three seasons as he became the starting middle linebacker. In his senior season at Carolina, he appeared in all 11 games (the Tar Heels’ game against UCF was canceled due to Hurricane Florence). He earned second-team ALL-ACC Honors for his play as a senior.

Professional career

Washington Redskins/Football Team/Commanders

2019
Holcomb was selected by the Washington Redskins in the fifth round (173rd overall) of the 2019 NFL Draft. He signed his four-year rookie contract on May 9, 2019. In Week 8 against the Minnesota Vikings, Holcomb forced a fumble on wide receiver Stefon Diggs that was recovered by teammate Ryan Anderson in the 19–9 loss. In week 12 against the Detroit Lions, Holcomb recorded a team high 13 tackles and sacked Jeff Driskel once in the 19–16 win.

2020
In Week 7 against the Dallas Cowboys, Holcomb recorded a sack on Andy Dalton and later intercepted a pass thrown by Dalton during the 25–3 win.
In Week 16 against the Carolina Panthers, Holcomb led the team with 11 tackles and sacked Teddy Bridgewater once during the 20–13 loss.

2021

Holcomb recorded an interception on Jameis Winston in Week 5 of the 2021 season against the New Orleans Saints. In Week 14, he recorded eight tackles and intercepted Dak Prescott and returned it 31 yards for his first career touchdown in a 27-20 loss to the Dallas Cowboys. He was placed on the COVID-19 reserve list on December 22, 2021 and forced to sit out of the Week 16 game against the Cowboys. On December 27, he was placed back on the active roster.

2022
Holcomb entered the 2022 season as the Commanders' starting middle linebacker. He missed four games with a knee injury before being placed on injured reserve on November 25, 2022. In December 2022, Holcomb underwent foot surgery ending his season. He finished the 2022 season with 60 tackles and one pass deflection over seven games.

Pittsburgh Steelers
On March 16, 2023, Holcomb signed a three-year contract with the Pittsburgh Steelers.

References

External links

Pittsburgh Steelers bio
North Carolina Tar Heels bio

1996 births
Living people
American football linebackers
North Carolina Tar Heels football players
People from New Smyrna Beach, Florida
Players of American football from Florida
Sportspeople from Volusia County, Florida
Washington Commanders players
Washington Football Team players
Washington Redskins players
Pittsburgh Steelers players